Dasht-e Latehor (also Romanized as Dasht-e Lateḩor; also known as Lateḩor and Latḩor) is a village in Kuhpayeh Rural District, in the Central District of Kashan County, Isfahan Province, Iran. At the 2006 census, its population was 134, in 39 families.

References 

Populated places in Kashan County